The Ministry of Communities and Territories Development was the Ukrainian government ministry responsible for public housing infrastructure development. It was dissolved on 2 December 2022.

History
The Ministry was established in 2005 as the Ministry of Construction, Architecture, and Public Housing and Utilities. It also can be considered as a successor of the Ministry of Construction and Architecture that existed before 1994. In 2007-2010 the ministry was split into two: Ministry of Regional Development & Construction and Ministry of Public Housing and Utilities.

On 2 December 2022 the Shmyhal Government merged the Ministry of Infrastructure with the Ministry of Communities and Territories Development creating the Ministry of Development of Communities, Territories and Infrastructure.

Structure
The ministry consists of the central body of ministry headed by its leadership composed of a minister, his/hers first deputy, and other deputies in assistance to the minister. Part of ministry compose several state administrations that are specialized in certain field and coordinate operations of government companies.

Agencies and institutes
 State Architectural-Construction Inspection of Ukraine
 V.N. Shimanovsky Ukrainian Institute of Steel Construction

Preserves
The list of the State Historical Preserve that are directed by the Ministry
 National Sanctuary "Sophia of Kyiv"
 Saint Sophia Cathedral in Kyiv
 Golden Gate, Kyiv
 St. Cyril's Church
 St Andrew's Church, Kyiv
 Sudak Fortress
 Castles of Ternopil region (created in 2005)
 Zbarazh Castle (core site since 1994)
 Vyshnivets Complex (added in 1999)
 Skalat Castle (added in 2002)
 Kryvche Castle (added in 2008)
 Terebovlya Castle (added in 2008)
 Mykulyntsi Castle (added in 2008)
 Zoloty Potik Castle (added in 2008)
 Yazlovets Castle (added in 2008)
 Pidzamochok Castle (added in 2008)
 Skala-Podilska Castle (added in 2008)
 Chortkiv Castle (added in 2010)
 Kamianets
 Chernihiv Ancient
 Hlukhiv
 Old Uman
 Khotyn Fortress
 State Historical-Architectural Preserve in the city of Zhovkva
 State Historical-Architectural Preserve in the city of Belz
 Kremenets-Pochaiv Preserve
 State Historical-Architectural Preserve in the city of Berezhany

List of ministers

See also
Cabinet of Ministers of Ukraine
List of historic reserves in Ukraine - Complete list of all State Preserves of Cultural Heritage

References

External links 
 Official Website of the Ukrainian Ministry of Regional Development, Construction, and Public Housing and Utilities

Regional Development, Construction, and Communal Living
Regional Development, Construction, and Communal Living
Ukraine, Regional Development
Ukraine
2005 establishments in Ukraine
Ministry of Regional Development, Construction, and Communal Living